Vengoor is a Gram panchayat in Koovappady Block in Kunnathunadu Taluk in the Ernakulam District, state of Kerala, India.

It is one of the largest panchayats (248.01 Sq Km) in Kerala State. The nearest city is Perumbavoor and is around 10 km from Vengoor. Places around Vengoor are: Kombanad, Kuruppampady, Paniyely, Panamkuzhy, Chundakuzhy, Mekkappala, Mudakkuzha, Kodanadu and Nedungapra. The tourist attractions like "Paniyeli Poru Waterfalls" and "Panamkuzhy Mahogany forests" in the bank of the famous "Periyar River" are in Vengoor Panchayat. Vengoor Pincode is 683546 with 10.14946 latitude and 76.55806 longitude.

References 

One Of the main Lower primary school is Govt Lower Primary School Paniyely

 Churches
1.Mar Kauma Jacobite Syrian Church

2.Mar Thoma Church Vengoor

Temples

1. Devi Temple 

Educational institutions

1. Mar Kauma HSS

2.Mar Kauma English Medium School

3.Santhome English Medium(CBSE) School

4.Govermment LPS Vengoor

5.Rajagiri College

Arts and Sports Association's

1. YMA Vengor

2.Seasons arts and Sports club, Yerusalem Para

3.Nebu's Chappel

Cities and towns in Ernakulam district